United Arab Republic v Sudan was the decisive match of group stage at the 1959 African Cup of Nations. The match was played at the Prince Farouk Stadium in Cairo on 29 May 1959. Unlike other Africa Cup of Nations, the 1959 winner was determined by a final group stage, with the final three teams playing in round-robin format, instead of a knockout stage. This was the first edition to feature a final group stage and one of two, alongside the 1976 African Cup of Nations, to promote this format.

Each team had defeated Ethiopia but the goal difference was in favor of United Arab Republic, who had beaten Ethiopia 4-0 while Sudan had won 1–0. Therefore, Sudan needed to win the last match to claim the title of champions of Africa; any other result would have the United Arab Republic retain the title they had won (as Egypt) in 1957.

United Arab Republic beat Sudan 2−1, therefore keeping first place in the group and winning their second consecutive title.

Background
The road to the title in the 1959 Africa Cup of Nations was unique, with a round-robin group instead of a knockout stage. The three competition teams were United Arab Republic (host country), Sudan and Ethiopia.

United Arab Republic and Sudan won their matches against Ethiopia, United Arab Republic by 4–0 to top the group, ahead of Sudan who won by 1–0.

Match

Match details

Aftermath

References

Final
1
Africa Cup of Nations Final
Egypt national football team matches
Sudan national football team matches
1950s in Cairo
Sports competitions in Cairo
Football in Cairo
May 1959 sports events in Africa